In molecular biology, the enteroviral 3′ UTR element is an RNA structure found in the 3′ UTR of various enteroviruses. The overall structure forms the origin of replication (OriR) for the initiation of (-) strand RNA synthesis. Pseudoknots have also been predicted in this structure.

See also 
Enterovirus 5′ cloverleaf cis-acting replication element
Enterovirus cis-acting replication element

References

External links 
 

Cis-regulatory RNA elements
Enteroviruses